Natalie Elise Hall or Natalie Melinda Hall (born January 25, 1990) is a Canadian actress and singer. She has appeared in various Broadway, film and TV productions. One of her first TV appearances was when she portrayed the role of Colby Chandler on the soap opera All My Children from 2009 to 2011. Hall appeared opposite Miles Teller, Josh Brolin and Jeff Bridges in the 2017 film Only the Brave.

Early life
Hall grew up in Vancouver, British Columbia. Her mother was a ballerina. Hall grew up with two brothers, of which she has said "I grew up loving the arts but I also was such a tomboy, I loved sports and was very competitive." She grew up playing soccer on an all-boys soccer team. Hall played the leading role  in a community theatre production of Annie. She earned a first place representing British Columbia in a national singing competition. Hall was trained at the London Academy of Ballet and graduated with honors of distinction in dance when she was sixteen.

Career
Hall initially moved to New York City. She performed as Val in a national touring production of A Chorus Line. Hall says about her first role, "It was an amazing experience. I had to grow up so fast working with such talent on a big stage". Her portrayal of Val earned a nomination for an Ovation award.

Acting
ABC announced that Hall had been cast in the role of Colby Chandler in the soap All My Children. Hall made her debut on November 25, 2009. Hall filmed her first scenes in mid October just before the show relocated to Los Angeles. She relocated to Los Angeles in 2010. Hall made her last appearance in the final network broadcast of All My Children on September 23, 2011.

On June 29, 2011, it was announced that Hall would be replacing Natalie Floyd as Hanna's soon-to-be stepsister, Kate Randall, in the ABC Family series Pretty Little Liars, playing the role until 2012. She played Ellie King née Davis, in Love's Christmas Journey, a four-part mini-series in 2011.

In 2013, she was cast as Taylor in The CW series Star-Crossed. Hall described her character as the "Queen Bee with a big heart" and a risk-taker in love. Hall played Britney in the series revival of Lifetime comedy drama Drop Dead Diva originally for two episodes however came back for another episode. Hall joined the cast of HBO's True Blood for its final season, appearing as resident villain Sarah Newlin's (Anna Camp) newly turned vampire sister, Amber Mills, for three episodes. She appeared on the cover of the Canadian fashion magazine Fave.

Hall guest starred in USA Network medical comedy-drama Royal Pains as Hope, a burlesque dancer who turns to Jeremiah for help when she begins experiencing pain during her act. Hall is also a member of the Prestigious "Actors Studio" in New York. Hall was most recently cast in the upcoming untitled Marc Cherry ABC pilot. Natalie Hall was seen in UnREAL season four on Lifetime. Also, in the CW series Charmed playing Lucy.

Music
Hall performs in various musicals in New York. In the film Rising Stars, Hall performed "Better with You", the music video for the song featuring Hall was later released. She was also featured in the song "Free To Fall" which also appeared in the film and the official soundtrack. Hall performed "Hallelujah I Love Her So" by Ray Charles at the "It Gets Better Project's "A Better Holiday" concert benefiting The Ali Forney Center on December 16, 2012.

Personal life
On July 1, 2017, Hall married Jack H. Robbins; a U.S. Marine who formerly served on active duty. In May 2021, Hall announced that they had welcomed their first child, a son.

Filmography

Film

Television

References

External links

1990 births
Living people
21st-century Canadian actresses
Actresses from Vancouver
Canadian child actresses
Canadian emigrants to the United States
Canadian film actresses
Canadian musical theatre actresses
Canadian soap opera actresses
Canadian television actresses